Netherlands competed at the 2016 Winter Youth Olympics in Lillehammer, Norway from 12 to 21 February 2016.

Medalists

Medalists in mixed NOCs events

Alpine skiing

Boys

Girls

Ice hockey

Short track speed skating

Boys

Girls

Mixed team relay

Qualification Legend: FA=Final A (medal); FB=Final B (non-medal); FC=Final C (non-medal); FD=Final D (non-medal); SA/B=Semifinals A/B; SC/D=Semifinals C/D; ADV=Advanced to Next Round; PEN=Penalized

Skeleton

Snowboarding

Slopestyle

Speed skating

Boys

Girls

Mixed team sprint

See also
Netherlands at the 2016 Summer Olympics

References

2016 in Dutch sport
Nations at the 2016 Winter Youth Olympics
Netherlands at the Youth Olympics